High Fidelity Boys - Live 1979 is a full-length live album by the band The Suburbs recorded between March and October 1979 at Jay's Longhorn in Minneapolis, Minnesota. It was released by Terry Katzman's Garage D'or Records in 2006.

Track listing 
 Stubby Voodoo
 I'm Bored
 Amyl Nitrate
 I Like the Beat
 Gotta Go Right Now
 Alterations
 Drinking in the Day
 Memory
 Housewife
 Beat Me with a Hammer
 Baby Heartbeat
 Tiny People
 Beejstate
 You
 Black Leather Stick
 When I Get Home
 Bongo Rock
 Life on Earth
 Big Steer
 Your Lies, the Sky
 Prehistoric Jaws
 Googles On
 High Fidelity Boys
 I Shoot Pistols
 Change Agent
 World War Three
 Chemistry Set
 Cig Machine
 Stereo
 Underwater Lovers
 Daredevil 69'
 Cows

Personnel
 Blaine John Chaney (BEEJ) - Vocals and Beejtar
 Bruce C. Allen - Vocals and lead guitar
 Hugo Klaers - Drums and vocals
 Michael Halliday - Bass
 Chan Poling - Vocals and keys

Credits
Produced and arranged by Terry Katzman
Mastered by Tom Herbers at Third Ear Recording, 2006
Photos: Greg Helgeson, Michael Marcos, Laurie Allen, Twin/Tone archives; inside band collage by Bruce C. Allen
Recorded on a Trusty Onkyo Deck
Research by Mark Janovec and Tarik Straub, Paul Stark, Charley Hallman, Peter Jesperson were Twin/Tone
Stage introductions by Peter Jesperson and Hugo Klaers

References

High Fidelity Boys - Live 1979 compact disc, 2006

External links 
Twin/Tone Records: The Suburbs
The Suburbs Band Site
Album cover images

2006 live albums
The Suburbs albums